Mina Live '78 is an album by Italian singer Mina, released in 1978.

Recorded at the Bussoladomani theatre on August 23, 1978, it captured the last public appearance made by the singer.

It was arranged and conducted by Pino Presti, with Nuccio Rinaldis and Albramo Pesatori as the sound engineers.

Track listing

Vol. 1
Side A
 Stasera io qui - 2:06 - (Ivano Fossati)
 Stayin' Alive - 1:54 - (Barry Gibb-Robin Gibb-Maurice Gibb)
 L'importante è finire - 2:59 - (Cristiano Malgioglio-Alberto Anelli)
 Non può morire un'idea - 4:40 - (Ivano Fossati)
 E poi... - 5:16 - (Andrea Lo Vecchio-Shel Shapiro)

Side B
 Sognando - 4:26 - (Don Backy)
 Ancora ancora ancora - 5:13 - (Cristiano Malgioglio-Gianpietro Felisatti)
 Lacreme napulitane - 5:10 - (Libero Bovio-Francesco Buongiovanni)
 El porompompero - 3:04 - (José Antonio Ochaita-Xandro Valerio-Juan Solano)

Vol. 2
Side A

 Georgia on My Mind - 3:18 - (Hoagy Carmichael-Stuart Gorrell)
 Angela - 1:44 - (José Feliciano-Janna Merlyn Feliciano)
 Margherita - 4:10 - (Riccardo Cocciante-Marco Luberti)
 Città vuota (It's a Lonely Town) - 3:44 - (Doc Pomus-Mort Shuman-Giuseppe Cassia)
 Amante amore - 3:39 - (Cristiano Malgioglio-Giuseppe Prestipino)

Side B
 Emozioni - 2:11 - (Lucio Battisti-Mogol)
 Ancora tu] - 1:44 - (Lucio Battisti-Mogol)
 Si, viaggiare - 1:16 - (Lucio Battisti-Mogol)
 I giardini di marzo - 4:32 - (Lucio Battisti-Mogol)
 We Are the Champions - 4:07 - (Freddie Mercury)
 Grande grande grande - 4:26 - (Tony Renis-Alberto Testa)

Mina (Italian singer) live albums
1978 live albums
Albums conducted by Pino Presti
Albums arranged by Pino Presti